Schausiania is a genus of moths in the family Cossidae.

Species
 Schausiania arpiodes Dognin, 1923
 Schausiania ecparilis (Schaus, 1905) (Hemipecten)
 Schausiania furfurens Hering, 1923
 Schausiania ophthalmodes Hering, 1923
 Schausiania philoba Druce, 1898

Status unclear
 Schausiania velutina Schaus

Former species
 Schausiania acutipennis Schaus, 1905
 Schausiania albimacula Dognin, 1923
 Schausiania alfarae Schaus, 1911
 Schausiania charmion Schaus, 1934
 Schausiania cossuloides Schaus, 1905
 Schausiania gaudeator Schaus, 1911
 Schausiania julius Schaus, 1921
 Schausiania marmorata Schaus, 1905
 Schausiania niveogrisea Schaus, 1905
 Schausiania orima Druce, 1906
 Schausiania rotundipuncta Schaus, 1905
 Schausiania salara Druce, 1900
 Schausiania vinnea Schaus, 1921

References

External links
Natural History Museum Lepidoptera generic names catalog

Cossidae genera